Serine/threonine-protein phosphatase 2A regulatory subunit B is an enzyme that in humans is encoded by the PPP2R4 gene.

Protein phosphatase 2A is one of the four major Ser/Thr phosphatases and is implicated in the negative control of cell growth and division. Protein phosphatase 2A holoenzymes are heterotrimeric proteins composed of a structural subunit A, a catalytic subunit C, and a regulatory subunit B. The regulatory subunit is encoded by a diverse set of genes that have been grouped into the B/PR55, B'/PR61, and B''/PR72 families. These different regulatory subunits confer distinct enzymatic specificities and intracellular localizations to the holozenzyme. The product of this gene belongs to the B' family. This gene encodes a specific phosphotyrosyl phosphatase activator of the dimeric form of protein phosphatase 2A. Alternative splicing results in multiple transcript variants encoding different isoforms.

Interactions
PPP2R4 has been shown to interact with PPP2R3A, CCNG1 and Janus kinase 2.

References

Further reading